Szczurek is a Polish surname meaning "little rat". Notable people with the surname include:

 Łukasz Szczurek (born 1988), Polish biathlete
 Mateusz Szczurek (born 1975), Polish economist and politician
 Wojciech Szczurek (born 1963), Polish politician

Polish-language surnames